Cannon Rock is an 1895 oil painting by Winslow Homer. It is part of the Metropolitan Museum of Art's collection.

Description
Cannon Rock is an 1895 oil painting depicting an offshore wave breaking over a submerged shelf, with water surging into an inlet created by rocks in the foreground. The work is part of the Metropolitan Museum of Art's collection.

Reception
The New York Times Geraldine Fabricant said the painting is not a literal representation and "bears little resemblance to the actual place". She writes, "In reality, the offshore wave would break only at low tide, but the wave fills the inlet only at high tide." In his Winslow Homer in the 1890s: Prout's Neck Observed, Homer expert Philip Beam noted the artist's rearranging of the horizontal ledges of rock into a triangular shape so that "it rivets attention on his main motive".

See also
 1895 in art

References

1895 paintings
Water in art
Paintings by Winslow Homer
Paintings in the collection of the Metropolitan Museum of Art